Seleznivka, where  may mean a male duck. I may refer to the following places in Ukraine:

 Seleznivka, Donetsk Oblast
 Seleznivka, Luhansk Oblast
 Seleznivka, Sumy Oblast